German Medical Online is a portal for the worldwide presence of German medicine.

The Portal provides information about the medical sector in Germany, about Medical Treatment in Germany and Medical Equipment from Germany and serve as a source of information and contact for international users.

The Portal is divided in 5 categories:
 Leading Hospitals, Clinics, Medical Centers
 Leading Medical Specialists, Medical Doctors
 Medical Equipment, MedTech, Instruments
 Pharma Companies, Laboratories
 Patient and Travel Services, Hotels

The Portal has been founded in January 2008 and presented at the Arab Health Exhibition in Dubai to an international audience.

The resource is provided by the Bennad Ltd., the publisher of the German Medical Journal.

References 
 German Medical Online - About GMO

External links 
 German Medical Online Portal
 Twitter
 Facebook
 German Medical Journal

German medical websites